Hebius venningi, commonly known as the Chin Hills keelback or Venning's keelback, is a species of snake in the family Colubridae. The species is endemic to Asia.

Etymology
The specific name, venningi, is in honor of British ornithologist Francis Esmond Wingate Venning (1882–1970).

Geographic range
H. venningi is found in southwestern China (Yunnan and Guangxi), northeastern India (Meghalaya, Mizoram, and Arunachal Pradesh), and northern Myanmar. It is also reported from Bangladesh.

Habitat
The preferred natural habitats of H. venningi are forest and freshwater wetlands, at altitudes of

Description
H. venningi is grayish brown dorsally, and yellowish or pinkish ventrally.

Diet
H. venningi preys upon tadpoles.

Reproduction
H. venningi is oviparous.

References

Further reading
Das I (2002). A Photographic Guide to Snakes and other Reptiles of India. Sanibel Island, Florida: Ralph Curtis Books. 144 pp. . (Amphiesma venningi, p. 19).
Smith MA (1943). The Fauna of British India, Ceylon and Burma, Including the Whole of the Indo-Chinese Sub-region. Reptilia and Amphibia. Vol. III.—Serpentes. London: Secretary of State for India. (Taylor and Francis, printers). xii + 583 pp. (Natrix venningi, pp. 286–287).
Wall F (1910). "A new Tropidonotus from the Chin Hills". Journal of the Bombay Natural History Society 20: 345–346. (Tropidonotus venningi, new species).

venningi
Snakes of Asia
Snakes of China
Reptiles of India
Reptiles of Myanmar
Reptiles described in 1910
Taxa named by Frank Wall